The following is a list of schools in the spa town of Cheltenham. In accordance with the "Eruditio" (Education) part of its motto, Cheltenham is a centre for education.

References

See also
List of schools in Gloucestershire

Cheltenham